Alipur is a village located in Gauribidanur Taluk of Chikkaballapur District, Karnataka State, India. It is located off State Highway 94, 55 km from Kempegowda International Airport and 70 km from Bangalore. It is a Shia Muslim-majority village.

Alipur's pin code is 561213. Its postal head office is located in Thondebhavi. 

Alipur is surrounded by other small villages such as Bevinahalli (4 km), Gedare (6 km), Kallinayakanahalli (7 km), and Thondebhavi Hobli (8 km). Kannada, Telugu and Urdu are the local languages spoken in Alipur.

Bangalore, Doddaballapura, Gauribidanur, Hindupur, and Tumkur are the nearby towns and cities of Alipur, to which it has road connections.

See also
Alipur Sign Language

References

External links

Villages in Chikkaballapur district